Line C is a line on the Prague Metro. It crosses the right-bank half of the city center in the north-south directions and turns to the east at both ends of the line. It is the system's oldest and most used line, being opened in 1974 and transporting roughly 26,900 persons per hour in the peak.

History

Segment I.C
Construction was started in 1966 on an underground rapid tram line. One year later, the project was changed to a metro line. This segment, leading from Florenc to Kačerov, was opened on May 9, 1974. It is mostly built using cut-and-cover technology, except for bored tunnels around the Pankrác station and crossing of the Nusle valley inside the Nusle Bridge. Between the Muzeum and Hlavní nádraží stations is the shortest distance in the system (ca. 400 m).

Interior of the stations on this segment is made mostly using marble blocks, the main exceptions being Vyšehrad with large glass windows and  Budějovická with limestone blocks.

Segment II.C
In 1975 commenced the construction of the second segment, going from Kačerov to large housing estates in the southern parts of the city. Interior decoration consists mostly of ceramic tiles, except the end station Háje, using limestone blocks and aluminium tiles.

Segment III.C
The third segment, connecting Holešovice district with the city center, was opened in 1984. Its stations are decorated by ceramic tiles similar to the second segment, but here they are larger.

Segment IV.C
The fourth segment is the only one in the history of Prague metro, which has been divided into two construction segments

Segment IV.C1
The segment IV.C1, opened in 2004, extends from Nádraží Holešovice to the temporary terminus Ládví.
Construction of this segment, which began in 2000, is perhaps the most difficult in the history of the Metro. Unique technology was used in constructing the tunnel under the river Vltava: The concrete tunnel tubes were made in a dry dock on the shore, the riverbed was excavated and the tubes were then laid down into the pits. The tunnels were due to the elimination of the piston effect, which is unpleasant to passengers in the stations, built as double-track.
Station Kobylisy is the first and as of 2008 only single-vaulted bored station in the prague metro.
This segment holds several records in the Prague metro:
 Longest distance between two stations – Nádraží Holešovice and Kobylisy, 2,748 m
 Highest above-sea-level station – Ládví, 
 deepest station below surface on line C – Kobylisy, 
 Highest climb between two stations – Nádraží Holešovice and Kobylisy,

Segment IV.C2
After opening of the previous segment, the construction immediately continued in the direction of Prosek and Letňany. The construction lasted almost 4 years until it was opened on May 8, 2008. The segment from Ládví to Prosek is built using cut-and-cover methods, while the segment from Prosek to Letňany is mostly bored.

Summary

Rolling stock
Ечс: 1974 - 1997
81-71: 1978 - 2003
81-71M: 1996 - 2005
Siemens M1: 2000 - present

Name changes

References

External links
Architecture photo series of all stations of C line (Prague Metro)

Prague Metro
Railway lines opened in 1974